Durai is a 2008 Indian Tamil-language action film directed by A. Venkatesh starring Arjun and Kirat Bhattal.

Plot
Raja (Arjun) works with a cook Arusuvai Ambi (Vivek). Raja comes across Anjali (Kirat Bhattal), who catches his interest. She falls for Raja, but he cannot remember anything of his past. All he recollects are vague images and memories that disturb him in his sleep. After a sequence of events and a chase by rowdies, Raja collects his past.

Raja, a year ago, was Durai, the close associate of honest politician Deivanayagam (K. Viswanath). Durai, who leads a happy life with his wife Meena (Gajala) and son, is hesitant to assume the post. Anjali, a reporter, pursues him for interviews and falls in love. Deivanayagam is killed, and the blame falls on Dorai. His wife and son are murdered. Eventually, Dorai alias Raja takes on his enemies and cracks the truth behind Deivanayakam's death. Action oozes all the way.

Cast
 Arjun as Durai (Raja)
 Kirat Bhattal as Anjali
 Gajala as Meena
 Suma Guha as Sandhya
 Vivek as Arusuvai Ambi
 K. Viswanath as Deivanayagam
 Vincent Asokan as Dharma
 Amit Dhawan as Shanmugam
 Vennira Aadai Moorthy
 S. N. Lakshmi
 Shanmugarajan
 O. A. K. Sundar as DC Eswara Pandian
 Stunt Gopal

Soundtrack 
The soundtrack was composed by D. Imman and he remixed yesteryear chartbuster hit "Raja Rajathi" from Agni Natchathiram composed by Ilayaraja

Critical reception
Indiaglitz wrote "Loads of action is the hallmark of any Arjun film. Durai is no different from his routine commercial action entertainers, where he takes on baddies, fights corrupt system and romances heroines. Director A Venkatesh seemingly inspired by Hollywood flicks like Bourne Identity and Gladiator." Behindwoods wrote "Overall, Durai is a regular Arjun movie that fails to provide the regular entertainment. The weak story and loose script are the major drawbacks and with all his experience in tinsel town, Arjun ought to have done better. Even the trademark action sequences are missing with only the climax fight justifying the title of Action King."

References

External links

2008 films
2000s Tamil-language films
Indian action films
Films scored by D. Imman
Films about amnesia
Films directed by A. Venkatesh (director)
2008 action films